Kingmaker is the eighth studio album by Canadian-New Zealand country singer Tami Neilson, released in July 2022. The album debuted at number one on the Official New Zealand Music Chart.

Production

Neilson was disheartened after the COVID-19 pandemic in New Zealand stalled the promotion of her previous album Chickaboom! (2020), and was uninspired to write music in 2020. Writing for Kingmaker began in early 2021, and took six months. The album was primarily inspired by Neilson's experiences as an Indigenous woman in the music industry, and she wanted to write an album that had a "cinematic arc", similar to a film soundtrack. Sonically, the album was inspired by Nancy & Lee (1968) and the subsequent music released by Nancy Sinatra and Lee Hazlewood, as well as musicians Ennio Morricone and Bobby Gentry.

The song "Beyond the Stars" was written together with Delaney Davidson, with both musicians expressing mourning for their fathers. Neilson was scheduled to perform at the Luck Reunion festival in Texas in March 2020, however the festival was cancelled and a livestream was released in its place. American country musician Willie Nelson and his family were watching the concert, which led to Neilson developing a friendship with Nelson's wife Annie D'Angelo, and led to Nelson being a featured vocalist on the song.

The album was recorded in a week at Neil Finn's Roundhead Studios in Auckland.

Release and promotion

The first single released from the album was "Beyond the Stars", featuring American country musician Willie Nelson in April 2022. This was followed by "Baby You're a Gun" in May, "Careless Woman" in June and "Kingmaker" in July.

Critical reception

At the 2022 Aotearoa Music Awards, won the awards for Best Country Artist, Best Solo Artist and Best Producer for her work on Kingmaker. 2022 was the sixth time Neilson had won the Best Country Artist award, and Neilson's Best Producer award was the first time the award had been given to a woman since Bic Runga won the award in 2006 for her album Birds (2005).

Track listing

Credits and personnel

Vanessa Abernethy – choir
Brett Adams – guitar
Miranda Adams – 1st violin
Robert Ashworth – viola
Nick Atkinson – clarinet, saxophone
Sophia Bayly – photography
Christine Bowie – viola
Tom Broome – drums, percussion
Ashley Brown – cello
Steve Chadie – engineer (5)
Chris Chetland – mastering
Diana Cochrane – 2nd violin
Anna Coddington – choir
Alex Corbett – assistant engineer
Julia Deans – choir
David Garner – cello
Simon Gooding – mixing engineer
Gordon Hill – double bass
Bella Kalolo-Suraj – choir
Victoria Kelly – string arrangements
Chip Matthews – bass
Maria Francesca Melis – artwork
Charlie Neilson – backing vocals (4)
Sam Neilson – backing vocals (4)
Tami Neilson – liner notes, producer, vocals
Willie Nelson – vocals (5)
Liu-Yi Retallick – 1st violin
Neil Watson – pedal steel guitar
Yanghe Yu –  2nd violin

Charts

Weekly charts

Year-end charts

Release history

References

2022 albums
Tami Neilson albums
Albums recorded at Roundhead Studios